Johann Jakob Hunziker (1831 Bern - 1923) was a Swiss printer and amateur botanist, noted for his 1862 publication Nature's Selfprinting.

Hunziker was sent to Mangalore in southwestern India in 1857 by the Basel Mission Press to work there as a printer, his mandate being the production of Bibles, school books and maps. He became interested in the local plants and with modest botanical knowledge produced Useful and Ornamental Plants of the South India Flora, a series of 231 nature prints of specimens gathered by himself and his colleagues. These 'nature prints', termed 'botanautography' by Hunziker, were made by coating leaves with suitable printing ink and pressing them firmly onto a litho stone, leaving a realistic colour impression. The first book printed by this process appeared under the name of a local timber merchant, Venantius Peter Coelho, who clearly was a sponsor of the work. Later in 1862 the plates were published in English in 2 volumes as Nature's Selfprinting.

References

External links
Gallery

Swiss printers